Irvington is a commuter rail stop on the Metro-North Railroad's Hudson Line, located in  Irvington, New York.

History

The Hudson River Railroad reached the settlement by 1849; the first passengers on a regularly scheduled run through the village paid fifty cents to travel from Peekskill to Chambers Street in Manhattan on September 29, 1849.  The community was in the process of renaming itself after author Washington Irving, despite the fact that he was still alive at the time. In 1852, Irvington was also named for the first coal-fueled steam locomotive of the Hudson River Railroad. The HRR was acquired by the New York Central and Hudson River Railroad in 1869, and the New York Central Railroad in 1913.

The existing station house was built in 1889 and designed by the Shepley, Rutan and Coolidge architectural firm. As with most of the stations along the Hudson Line, it was transformed into a Penn Central station when New York Central merged with the Pennsylvania Railroad in 1968. Bankruptcy of the company followed by 1970, and Penn Central eventually turned passenger service over to the Metropolitan Transportation Authority of New York, who made it part of Metro-North in 1983.

Irvington's former New York Central Railroad station, built in 1889, has been a contributing property of the Irvington Historic District since January 15, 2014.  Since being retired as a ticket office in 1957, it has been utilized as an art and curio shop, an office for the Weyerhauser lumber yard which was located on the other side of the tracks – now Scenic Hudson Park – and the office of an architectural firm.  In 2016, with the addition of an outdoor garden, it was converted into a 20-seat café serving frozen yogurt.

Station layout
The station has two slightly offset high-level side platforms each eight cars long. Track 1 is only used by diesel trains since it does not have a third rail.

References

External links 
 

Irvington Metro-North Station (The Subway Nut)
 Entrance from Google Maps Street View

Metro-North Railroad stations in New York (state)
Former New York Central Railroad stations
Railway stations in Westchester County, New York
Historic district contributing properties in New York (state)
Irvington, New York
National Register of Historic Places in Westchester County, New York
Railway stations on the National Register of Historic Places in New York (state)
Railway stations in the United States  opened in 1849
1849 establishments in New York (state)